The 1981 Hamilton Tiger-Cats season was the 24th season for the team in the Canadian Football League and their 32nd overall. The Tiger-Cats finished in 1st place in the East Division for the second consecutive year with an 11–4–1 record. They lost the East Final to the heavy underdog Ottawa Rough Riders team that finished 5–11–0. In the first season of full inter-division play, the Tiger-Cats finished with a 6–0 record against the East Division, outscoring their opponents 197 to 71.

Preseason

Regular season

Season Standings

Season schedule

Postseason

Schedule

Awards and honours

1981 All-Stars
David Shaw, Defensive back
Harold Woods, Defensive back
Ben Zambiasi, Linebacker

References

Hamilton Tiger-cats Season, 1981
Hamilton Tiger-Cats seasons
1981 Canadian Football League season by team